The Metro Herald was an African-American newspaper published in Alexandria, Virginia for more than 25 years, covering Maryland, Washington DC and Virginia. from the early 1990s to February 2018. It was owned by Davis Communications Group, Inc. and was a member of the Virginia Press Association. In 1999, founder Paris Davis became chief executive officer of the startup Baltimore Press.

The format of the Metro Herald was a 24-page full-color paper, with a large Community News section as well as a classified ad section.

References 

African-American newspapers
Newspapers published in Virginia